Anything Is Possible is a 2013 American drama film written and directed by Demetrius Navarro and starring Ethan Bortnick (in his only feature film), Fatima Ptacek, Johnathan Bennett and Lacey Chabert. Although the filming was completed in September 2011, it was only released in the United States on September 24, 2013. Bortnick played the leading role as Nathan, a young boy who's separated from his mother when she goes missing during a trip to Japan to help after the tsunami. 

The film explores issues like homelessness, military family life and adoption. Lead star Bortnick co-wrote the music with Grammy Award-winning songwriter and producer Gary Baker and his team, Matthew Craig and Rob Collier. He recorded the soundtrack album for the film in Muscle Shoals, Alabama, thus making him the youngest actor to co-write the soundtrack and play the leading role in a feature film.

Plot
Nathan was devastated to hear that his mother, Army lieutenant Margaret Peters, was missing after a rescue mission in Japan. Back in Detroit, the news came as a shock to him, and he struggled to come to terms with it. To make matters worse, he discovers that his father, George, isn't his biological father. Due to this and his mother's long absence, Child Care Services came knocking at their door. Afraid of being taken away, Nathan splits before his father can explain. While George goes looking for him, Nathan takes to the streets of Detroit. There, he encounters Captain Miles, a homeless Iraq War veteran. It was, at first, unclear what Captain Miles' intention was with Nathan, but the veteran ultimately tricks him into seeking shelter at the home of Evelyn Strasser. This wealthy philanthropist finds out that her daughter Jesse has been hiding Nathan in the basement. Evelyn reunites Nathan with George, but not before discovering that Nathan is a musical prodigy. Unfortunately, the reunion is short-lived until Child Care Services can sort out the mess. In the meantime, the state will take custody of Nathan. This means that Nathan still has to go to the orphanage. The orphanage has its own set of problems as it is going to be closed soon due to a lack of funds. When the children learned about this, they decided to do some fundraising via a concert. They go all out to market their newly-founded musical prodigy via flyers that promise a sterling performance, and indeed, on the big day, Nathan raised both the roof and enough funds to support the orphanage. The icing on the cake was when Nathan's mother turned out to be alive after all and was reunited with her family.

Cast

Reception
One critic gave the film three stars, which according to their ratings mean that it is just fine and solid. The Dove Foundation gave the film five Doves, their highest rating as well as their Family Approved For All Ages seal, which means that it is an entertaining story that is suitable for the entire family. They also stated that Young Ethan Bortnick is similar to Nathan in terms of their capabilities.

One of the cast, Fatima Ptacek earned a nomination for the category Best Child Actor in a Film in the 2014 Nollywood and African Film Critics Awards.

References

Further reading
 

2013 drama films
2013 films
American drama films
Films set in Detroit
Films shot in Michigan
2010s English-language films
2010s American films